A slug is a counterfeit coin that is used to make illegal purchases from a coin-operated device, such as a vending machine, payphone, parking meter, transit farebox, copy machine, coin laundry, gaming machine, or arcade game. By resembling various features of a genuine coin, including the weight, size, and shape, a slug is designed to trick the machine into accepting it as a real coin.

Losses caused to vendors by slug usage may be the result of the loss of sales, the absence of revenue following the distribution of merchandise that was obtained at the vendor's expense, or the loss of cash that is distributed by the machine for overpayment with slugs. Honest customers may also suffer losses when change returned for overpayment is in the form of a slug rather than a genuine coin.

Though slug usage is illegal in the United States and elsewhere, prosecution for slug usage is rare due to the low value of the theft and the difficulty in identifying the offender. Offenders in casinos are most likely to be prosecuted, as casinos have high levels of video surveillance and other security measures, and tend to be more proactive in enforcement.

Use of other currencies
In some cases, a slug can be a genuine coin used in another country, with or without knowledge of the user.

 Until 2006, the Australian and New Zealand 5-, 10- and 20-cent pieces (previously sixpence, shilling, and florin respectively) were used interchangeably in both countries. These coins were of the same material and size with near identical obverses, so could circulate outside their home country for some time, although the New Zealand coins were worth about 20% less, potentially resulting in a small gain (to those passing them) in Australia and a similar loss in New Zealand.

 The 10 Syrian pound coin is often used as a slug in Norway, as the shape and weight of this coin strongly resembles the 20 Norwegian krone coin. While not easy to find in Norway, the Syrian coins are still used in automated machines there with such frequency that Posten Norge, the Norwegian postal service, decided to close many of their coins-to-cash machines on February 18, 2006, with plans to develop a system able to differentiate between the two coins. In the summer of 2005, a Norwegian man was sentenced to 30 days, suspended, for having used Syrian coins in arcade machines in the municipality of Bærum.

 The use of 100 won coins for the slug of 100 yen coins still commonly occurs, contributing to the conflict between Japanese and South Korean citizens. Similarly, until 2000, the South Korean 500 won coin could be modified to match the weight of the original 500 yen coin which was otherwise identical in diameter and composition, and thereby used to fool weight-sensitive vending machines.

 From the fall of the Soviet Union to the monetary reform in 1998, the Russian Federation often issued a commemorative one-ruble coin that was identical in size and weight to a 5 Swiss franc coin. For this reason, there have been several instances of these (worthless) ruble coins being used on a large scale to defraud automated vending machines in Switzerland.

 In 1988, Thailand started minting a bimetallic ten baht coin that is quite similar to the 2 euro coin (first issue in 2002) in weight, size and appearance. Because it is worth substantially less, it has been used to fool cashiers and automated vending machines since the introduction of physical euro currency.

 In the United Arab Emirates in August 2006, it became publicly known that the Philippine one-peso coin had the same size as the 1 United Arab Emirates dirham coin. With one dirham having a value nearly 14 times that of one Philippine peso, this has led to vending machine fraud in the United Arab Emirates.

Composition
Slugs are usually made from metals differing from those of real coins. While genuine US coinage is made from various alloys of copper, nickel, and zinc, Canadian coins are made mostly from steel with some copper and nickel, and euro coins are made from steel, nickel, and brass, slugs are frequently made from differing metals and alloys that are cheaper to obtain and mold, such as aluminum, tin, and lead.

Slugs may or may not have the face details of real coins. Some slugs that are made to match the face details may not be immediately recognizable as such to handlers, and may enter circulation.

Older, cheaper, and other low-tech machines that have fewer security measures are more likely to be defrauded by slug users. As an example, the fully mechanical mechanisms used in the traditional type of small vending machines that distribute candy or toys, and that can still often be found today at the entrances and/or exits of grocery stores and other retailers, can be fooled by cardboard coins. Many newer machines, especially those found in casinos, have additional detection that can identify more details of coins and detect those that do not resemble real coins.

See also
Coin counterfeiting
Coin rolling scams
Counterfeit money
Gresham's Law

References

Coins
Counterfeit money
Exonumia
Metallic objects